Dhamara is a joint stream in Odisha that is formed by the confluence of the Brahmani and Baitarani rivers south of the town of Chandabali. It lies in the Bhadrak district and empties into the Bay of Bengal. To the north of its mouth is the Dhamra Port and near the mouth is the Gahiramatha sanctuary, a nesting site for olive ridley sea turtles.

The Bhitarkanika wildlife sanctuary, famous for its estuarine crocodiles lie on the Dhamra estuary. Wheeler Island, a DRDO missile launch centre is located off the mouth of the Dhamra in the Bay of Bengal.

References 

Rivers of Odisha
Rivers of India